Old person smell is the characteristic odor of elderly humans. Much like many animal species, human odor undergoes distinct stages based on chemical changes initiated through the aging process. Research suggests that this enables humans to determine the suitability of potential partners based on age, in addition to other factors.

One study suggested that old person smell may be the result of 2-nonenal, an unsaturated aldehyde which is associated with human body odor alterations during aging; however, there are other hypotheses. Another study failed to detect 2-nonenal at all, but found significantly increased concentrations of benzothiazole, dimethylsulphone, and nonanal on older subjects.

In 2012, the Monell Chemical Senses Center published a press release claiming that the human ability to identify information such as age, illness, and genetic suitability from odor is responsible for the distinctive "old man smell". Sensory neuroscientist Johan Lundström stated, "Elderly people have a discernible underarm odor that younger people consider to be fairly neutral and not very unpleasant."

References

Old age
Gerontology
Fatty aldehydes
Body odor